Ami Boué (16 March 179421 November 1881) was a geologist of French Huguenot origin. Born at Hamburg he trained in Edinburgh and across Europe. He travelled across Europe, studying geology, as well as ethnology, and is considered to be among the first to produce a geological map of the world.

Career

Boué was born in Hamburg where his grandfather Jacques Chapeaurouge had settled in 1705 and established a shipping company which grew. Born in a wealthy home, Boué studied in Hamburg and Geneva before going to study medicine at Edinburgh from 1814 to 1817. Here he came under the influence of Robert Jameson, whose teachings in geology and mineralogy inspired his future career. Boué was thus led to make geological expeditions to various parts of Scotland and the Hebrides, and after taking his degree of M.D. in 1817 he settled for some years in Paris.

In 1820 he issued his Essai géologique sur l'Écosse, in which the eruptive rocks in particular were carefully described. He travelled much in Germany, Austria and southern Europe, studying various geological formations, and becoming one of the pioneers in geological research; he was one of the founders of the Société Géologique de France in 1830, and was its president in 1835. Boué married Eleonore Beinstingel in 1826 and lived for sometime in Berne and then at Vöslau. In 1841 he settled in Vienna, and became naturalized as an Austrian.

To the Imperial Academy of Sciences at Vienna he communicated important papers on the geology of the Balkan States (1859–1870), and he also published Mémoires géologiques et paléontologiques (Paris, 1832) and La Turquie d'Europe; observations sur la geographie, la géologie, l'histoire naturelle, etc. (Paris, 1840). This work was published in German under the title -- Die europäische T'ürkei—in 1890.

He was a correspondent of the Serbian Learned Society. In 1849 he published the first ethnological map of the Balkan Peninsula.

Evolution

Boué was an advocate of transmutation of species. He was influenced by the evolutionary views of Étienne Geoffroy Saint-Hilaire and Jean-Baptiste Lamarck.

He was supportive of spontaneous generation and argued that spontaneously generated organisms existed at the microscopic level between animals and plants.

Honours
Ami Boué Bluff on Graham Land in Antarctica and streets in Budapest, Varna, Vienna and Sofia are named after him.

References

External links 

 
 
 Works by Boué, Ami at the Biodiversity Heritage Library (BHL)
 
 

1794 births
1881 deaths
Alumni of the University of Edinburgh
Austrian ethnographers
19th-century Austrian geologists
Scientists from Hamburg
Presidents of Société géologique de France
Proto-evolutionary biologists
Wollaston Medal winners